Downs Park is located in Pasadena, Anne Arundel County, Maryland, United States. It is operated by Anne Arundel County Recreation and Parks and is open year-round. Organizations using the park include the Friends of Downs Park, Garden Volunteers, Volunteers-in-the-Park and the Downs Park Quilters Guild.

History
The land that makes up Downs Park changed hands several times in the 1700s and 1800s, before finally winding up in the possession of H.R. Mayo Thom, a tobacco importer. He used the property to create what was known as the Rocky Beach Farm, which included a mansion for his family, along with several cottages for his friends and workers. Most of this development is now gone, though some remnants still remain, with pavilions standing where vacation homes once were.

In 1977 the county purchased the farm and developed the land into Downs Park. On July 1, 1982, the park opened to the public.

Amenities

Dog beach 

The dog beach can be found in the northeastern part of the park.

Mother's Garden 

This Victorian-style garden was built in 1915 for Helen Hopkins Thom, and was maintained until sometime in the 1960s. When the park opened in 1982, volunteers revitalized the aged garden and it has since become a popular spot for weddings.

Pavilions 

The park contains three pavilions which can accommodate around 100 people, and one small pavilion that can accommodate around 50 people.

Sports 

The park has two basketball courts.

Trails 

The park contains five miles of paved and natural trails.

Youth camping area 
The park also offers a camping area for organized youth groups.

See also
 Fort Smallwood Park
 Kinder Farm Park
 Quiet Waters Park

References

Parks in Anne Arundel County, Maryland
Protected areas established in 1982
1982 establishments in Maryland